Scrobipalpa bifasciata is a moth in the family Gelechiidae. It was described by Povolný in 1971. It is found in Algeria.

The forewings are nearly pure white with a few gold-brown scales. The hindwings are white.

References

Scrobipalpa
Moths described in 1971